A# is a port of the Ada programming language to the Microsoft .NET platform. A# is freely distributed by the Department of Computer Science at the United States Air Force Academy as a service to the Ada community under the terms of the GNU General Public License.

AdaCore took over this development in 2007, and announced "GNAT for .NET", which is a fully supported .NET product with all of the features of A# and more. As of 2021, A# has fallen dramatically in popularity and is considered by some to be a dead language (there are no known users or implementations).

References

External links 
 A# for .NET
 Ada Sharp .NET Programming environment

Ada (programming language)
.NET programming languages